''This list is for pitchers. For career strikeouts by batters, see List of Major League Baseball career strikeouts by batters leaders
The following list is of the top 100 pitchers in career strikeouts in Major League Baseball. In baseball, a strikeout occurs when the batter receives three strikes during his time at bat. Strikeouts are associated with dominance on the part of the pitcher and failure on the part of the batter.

Nolan Ryan has the most career strikeouts in Major League Baseball. During a record 27-year career, he struck out 5,714 batters. The American League record is held by Roger Clemens (4,167 strikeouts), while in the National League, the record is 4,000 by Steve Carlton.

The parentheses adjacent to an active player denote the number of strikeouts in the current season.

List

A player is considered "inactive" if he has not played baseball for one year or has announced his retirement.

Stats updated as of the end of the 2022 season.

Active pitchers with 1,700 strikeouts (stats updated through 2022):
Gerrit Cole (1,930) - 257 in 2022
Johnny Cueto (1,812) - 102 in 2022
Yu Darvish (1,788) - 197 in 2022
Aníbal Sánchez (1,774) - 48 in 2022
Ian Kennedy (1,754) - 44 in 2022
Stephen Strasburg (1,723) - 5 in 2022
Lance Lynn (1,715) - 124 in 2022

See also
3,000 strikeout club

References

Strikeout p
Baseball records
Striking out the side
List of Major